André Tosel (15 June 1941 – 14 March 2017) was a French Marxist philosopher and academic administrator. He taught Philosophy at the University of Franche-Comté and Pantheon-Sorbonne University until he became a full professor of philosophy at the University of Nice Sophia Antipolis. He served as its vice president from 1992 to 1998, and as the director of its Center for the History of Ideas from 1998 to 2003. He was the author of several books about Marxism and Marxist theorists.

Early life
André Tosel was born on 15 June 1941 in Nice, France. He was raised as a Roman Catholic, and he took a leadership position in the Jeunesse Étudiante Chrétienne at university. He graduated from the École Normale Supérieure, where he was mentored by Louis Althusser. He earned the agrégation in Philosophy in 1965. Tosel joined the Maoist Internationalist Movement during the May 1968 events.  He was awarded a PhD in Philosophy in 1982.

Career
Tosel taught Philosophy at the University of Franche-Comté in Besançon and Pantheon-Sorbonne University in Paris. He was a professor of philosophy at the University of Nice Sophia Antipolis in Nice, where he was the vice president from 1992 to 1998. He also succeeded Dominique Janicaud as the director of the Center for the History of Ideas from 1998 to 2003. He was elected as a member of the governing board of its college of arts in 2002, and he retired as professor emeritus in 2012.

Tosel was the author of many books about Marxism and Marxist theorists. He wrote about Karl Marx and Friedrich Engels, but also Baruch Spinoza, Antonio Gramsci and Hegel, Immanuel Kant, and György Lukács. He was a contributor to Actuel Marx and La Pensée. He was a member of the Société française de philosophie.

In his research, Tosel was a critic of consumerism. He argued that capitalism was inherently violent as it rested upon servitude and poverty through debt. He argued in favour of emancipation from the "passive revolution" of globalised capitalism through resistance, or the advocacy of workers rights, feminism, postcolonialism, multiculturalism, and the rejection of neo-colonialism.

According to philosopher Yvon Quiniou, Tosel played a critical role in disseminating Marxist theories in academic circles.

Personal life, death and tributes
Tosel was married with children. He was a member of the French Communist Party from 1972 to 1984, and he re-joined the party in 2012, when he became associated with the Left Front.

Tosel died on 14 March 2017 in Nice.

On his death, Patrick Le Hyaric, the editor-in-chief of L'Humanité, said he was "overwhelmed with sadness" and said Tosel was "like a shining light, a touchstone in this world of ideological counter-punch where everything is hidden by powerful forces who want to take over the entirety of thought and culture."

Pierre Laurent, the chairman of the French Communist Party, said he was "very moved" by his death, and he added that Tosel had "a deep understanding of the difficulties faced by progressive forces and a willingness to exchange ideas and share his analyses and convictions, not only with a learned audience, but most importantly with young people and workers."

Works

References

1941 births
2017 deaths
People from Nice
École Normale Supérieure alumni
Academic staff of the University of Franche-Comté
Academic staff of the University of Paris
Academic staff of Côte d'Azur University
20th-century French philosophers
21st-century French philosophers
French Marxists
Marxist theorists
French Communist Party members
Spinoza scholars